Hindsiclava antealesidota is an extinct species of sea snail, a marine gastropod mollusc in the family Pseudomelatomidae, the turrids and allies.

Distribution
Fossils of this marine species were found in Pliocene strata in Florida, US; age range: 3.6 to 2.588 Ma.

References

 Mansfield, Wendell Clay. Miocene Gastropods and Scaphopods of the Choctawhatchee Formation of Florida: 1911–1930. No. 2-4. Florida State Geological Survey, 1930.
 W. P. Woodring. 1970. Geology and paleontology of canal zone and adjoining parts of Panama: Description of Tertiary mollusks (gastropods: Eulimidae, Marginellidae to Helminthoglyptidae). United States Geological Survey Professional Paper 306(D):299–452

External links
 Fossilworks: † Crassispira (Hindsiclava) antealesidota

antealesidota
Gastropods described in 1930